Sports Complex Olimpik is a football stadium in the city of Donetsk, Ukraine. 

Originally when the complex was built the stadium had seating for 680 spectators. Later in the autumn of 2010 it was expanded to 1000 spectators. Major reconstruction occurred both in 2013 and 2014 with the addition of 2 small stands and currently there is room for 3,000 spectators. 

Infrastructure sports complex consists of five training fields: 
 Two grass pitches – 
 Artificial pitch – 
 Small artificial pitch – 
 Small grass training area – 

The stadium facilities include four locker rooms, two coaching rooms, a referees room, a medical center, a media press area seating for 35–40, a gymnasium on the ground floor and separate rooms for players with dining facilities on the second floor. There is also reserved parking at the ground.

References

Football venues in Donetsk Oblast
Sport in Donetsk
Buildings and structures in Donetsk
Sports venues in Donetsk Oblast
FC Olimpik Donetsk